The Other Side of the Mirror and Other Darkover Stories is an anthology of fantasy and science fiction short stories edited by American writer Marion Zimmer Bradley. The stories are set in Bradley's world of Darkover. The book was first published by DAW Books (No. 698) in February 1987.

Contents
 Introduction by Marion Zimmer Bradley
 "The Other Side of the Mirror" by Patricia Floss
 "Bride Price" by Marion Zimmer Bradley
 "Everything but Freedom" by Marion Zimmer Bradley
 "Oathbreaker" by Marion Zimmer Bradley
 "Blood Hunt" by Linda Frankel & Paula Crunk

Sources 
 
 
 

Darkover books
1987 anthologies
American anthologies
Fantasy anthologies
Works by Marion Zimmer Bradley
DAW Books books